The Oppo Joy 3 is the second, and last, phone in the Oppo Joy series. It launched in August 2015. All phones in the series have the slogan "Leap Up, Reach Joy." Compared to the Oppo Joy Plus, the phone has 2 extra CPU cores, totaling four over the past generations' two. The phone also featured a better GPU, a bigger screen, and a slightly bigger chassis but improved screen-to-body ratio. The phone launched with a price of about €130 and two color options: White, and Gray.

Details 
The Oppo Joy 3 is an Android Smartphone launched in August 2015. It features a 4.5 inch, capacitive, IPS LCD display with the resolution of 480 by 854 with a pixel density of 218 PPI. The processor is a Mediatek MT6582 SoC (System-on-chip), with 1 gigabyte of single channel, 533 MHz memory, and 4 gigabytes of internal storage, with a microSDHC slot for removable storage.

References 

Oppo smartphones
Mobile phones introduced in 2015
Android (operating system) devices
Discontinued smartphones
Mobile phones with user-replaceable battery